All Together was a political coalition that participated in 2012 Serbian parliamentary election. The coalition is composed by five political parties:

Bosniak Democratic Union
Civil Alliance of Hungarians
Democratic Union of Croats
Hungarian Hope Movement
Hungarian Unity Party (Magyar Egység Párt - MEP)

Defunct political party alliances in Serbia